Ruben Blades Is Not My Name is a 2018 Panamanian documentary film directed by Abner Benaim. The documentary follows the life of Rubén Blades, a Panamanian musician, singer, composer, actor, activist, and politician, and his contributions to the New York "Salsa revolution", a Latin American music movement which has been estimated to have lasted between 1968 and 1985. It was selected as the Panamanian entry for the Best Foreign Language Film at the 91st Academy Awards, but it was not nominated.

Featuring 
Additional to Rubén Blade, a number of the Latin music scene's key figures are featured or interviewed in the documentary, a few of those names being Gilberto Santa Rosa, Paul Simon, Junot Diaz, and Sting. -Among others.

See also
 List of submissions to the 91st Academy Awards for Best Foreign Language Film
 List of Panamanian submissions for the Academy Award for Best Foreign Language Film

References

External links
 

2018 films
2018 documentary films
2010s Spanish-language films
Panamanian documentary films